The 1991 Gulf War and the 2003 Iraq war had important environmental impacts. Indeed, Persian Gulf countries, especially Kuwait and Iraq faced serious environmental disasters after the wars. 

Environmental impacts, due to the war and use of chemicals agents, include the impacts on nature and population health. 

The article present the effects of the Gulf war and Iraq war on the environment and the nature, and the impacts on population and veterans' health.

Wars 

 The Iran–Iraq War from September 1980 to August 1988.
 In 1990, Iraq invaded Kuwait claiming that Kuwait was a part of Iraq and also  that Kuwait stole oil from it. This Gulf war resulted in Operation Desert Storm in which Saddam Hussein was defeated.
 In March 2003, the US, UK, and Australia invaded Iraq. This again was a much smaller war than the first one, but the security situation deteriorated later.

The effects

Environment 

Environmental consequences of the Gulf War of 1991 were unprecedented and these included approximately about 3.5 million tons of crude oil released into the desert, and 800,000 tons of oil spilled into the Persian Gulf. In the desert, 250 oil lakes covered about 50 square kilometers, as a result of the sixty million barrels of oil that came from the burning oil wells. It is then estimated to be between six to eight million barrels of oil that polluted the marine environment.

By the February 27th ceasefire, the Saudi coast had suffered over 100 miles of damage. Oil, 15 inches deep in certain areas, destroyed the nesting grounds for endangered sea turtles and birds, fisheries, and shrimp-spawning areas. Beaches, tide pools, and seagrass beds had been damaged, and thousands of rare herons, flamingos, and other bird species were killed. The Sea Island Terminal oil spill on January 25, 1991, off of the Saudi coast, was determined during the Gulf War ceasefire to be a band of approximately 10–15 miles. The second major slick off of the Kuwaiti-Saudi coast was also from the Mina al Bakr offshore terminal of Iraq, which was also a spill of around 10 miles long. Over 600 oil wells were burning by February 26, 1991, and the temperatures in Kuwait dropped significantly as thick smoke engulfed the area. Over 1000 kilometers away, in southern Turkey, black acidic rain fell in Turkey in March 1991 as a result of the carbon particles from the Kuwaiti oil fires, which were carried by winds and that also spread this to countries like Iraq, Iran, and Syria.  Water supplies and crop irrigation in Iran were affected by the black rain as well.

The 1991 Gulf War had further environmental consequences, such as the damage of sewage treatment plants in Kuwait, resulting in the release of nearly about 50,000 cubic meters of raw sewage into Kuwait Bay per day. 

Eventually, it was like around 800 oil wells in Kuwait that continued to burn for months.  Nitrogen oxide, radium, hydrogen carbons, and hydrogen sulfide are among the other pollutants released by the burning of oil wells.

The atmospheric pollution as an outcome of the oil fires has also been linked to human health implications, indicating a notable increase in oil-related heavy metals such as nickel, vanadium, selenium, and cobalt in brain tumors. Airborne dust that was collected following the war also displayed contamination by these elements capable of causing DNA damage and increasing lipid peroxidation.

Health

The use of chemicals agents 
During the Gulf wars, the populations were exposed to chemical agents. Indeed, chemicals agent, for example Depleted Uranium (DU), was used for the first time during the first Gulf War in the tank kinetic energy penetrator or autocannon rounds.

After the Gulf wars, the United States Department of Veterans Affairs (VA) and research organizations evaluated and are still evaluating possible causes of veterans' health issues, and this included chemical and biological weapons.

However, the use of chemicals agent by both the US Army and Iraqi forces is still a subject of debate. In 1997, the US government published a report that states that:

 "The US Intelligence Community (IC) has assessed that Iraq did not use chemical weapons during the Gulf war. However, based on a comprehensive review of intelligence information and relevant information made available by the United Nations Special Commission (UNSCOM), we conclude that chemical warfare (CW) agent was released as a result of the US postwar demolition of rockets with chemical warheads in a bunker (called Bunker 73 by Iraq) and a pit in an area known as Khamisiyah."

For example, over 100,000 Gulf War Veterans have been exposed to these nerve agents chemicals during the demolition of a munitions storage depot in Khamisiyah.

A study by the Boston School of Public Health shows that there is a correlation between the deployed veterans in Iraq and health symptom reporting after the war. After their return from the Persian Gulf War, many veterans reported health symptoms and medical problems. This report states that:

"Persian Gulf-deployed veterans were more likely to report neurological, pulmonary, gastrointestinal, cardiac, dermatological, musculoskeletal, psychological and neuropsychological system symptoms than German veterans."

Gulf War Syndrome 
After the Gulf wars, the US Department of Veterans Affairs and the National Academy of Science (NAS) provided multiple reports on the Gulf war illnesses.

A report published in 2007 on the Gulf War Illnesses  states that Veterans in Iraqi were exposed to different chemicals agents as DU, pesticides, nerve gas sarin, and multiple vaccinations.

The report from Research Advisory Committee on Gulf War Veterans' Illnesses (RAC) established the link between neurological veterans' illnesses and the exposure neurotixins.

The Gulf War illness or Gulf War syndrome refers to the illness and neurological symptoms as "fatigue, muscle and joint pain, headaches, loss of memory and poor sleep" encounters by veterans after the Gulf War in 1991. This syndrome was associated with different causes such as the exposure to depleted uranium, sarin nerve agents, organophosphate pesticides, and less likely oil well fire, Anthrax vaccine and combat stress.

Cancer 
In the decade following Gulf War I, veterans and Iraqi physicians reported a sharp increase in severe health problems, including cancer, associated with depleted uranium bullets used by the United States. Depleted uranium is carcinogenic and has been linked to neurologic health problems. The war left Iraq suffering from depleted uranium pollution with elevated levels in the soil as a result of weapons testing, military research, and the estimated 1200 tonnes of munition dropped on Iraq during the war.  The number of lung and breast cancer, Leukemia, and Lymphoma cases had doubled to tripled in many areas of Iraq by 2012. Contaminated soil likely impacted human health by way of food chains that then posed long-term radiation hazards.

Posttraumatic Stress disorder 
In 1995, incidences of posttraumatic stress disorder were high in Kuwait. Approximately 27 percent of Kuwait I have this psychiatric disorder. 66 percent of those with diagnosable post-traumatic disorder were still dreaming nightmares about some war events. In addition, many boys were dreaming different dreams about Saddam trying to kill them or hurt their families. A documentary movie about affected families was made. A boy saw his father tortured and then killed by the Iraqi soldiers; after this, the boy lost the ability to speak. Another affected victim has speech problems because Iraqi soldiers forced her to watch her two sons killed.

Fertility Problems 
Some studies point out a link between fertility problems and the Gulf wars. US veterans from the Gulf Wars faced risks of infertility. Indeed, research shows that deployed veterans during the Gulf wars faced issues concerning fertility, conceptions or live births, and pregnancy fathered problems

In times of war, the fertility of the population is also affected. Researches show that the fertility trend in Iraq was in decline, and the war emphasize this trend. Moreover, the use of chemicals weapons affected the population fertility. The case of Fallujah is an example of the impacts of the war on fertility. The city of Fallujah had been bombed during the war and chemical agents were used. Today, doctors and researchers found that there is an increase in congenital defects and infertility. Many children were born with nervous system problems.

Cleanup 
The Persian Gulf countries cooperated to clean up the ruin and prevent future havoc.

Over the years volunteer Kuwaiti divers have been cleaning the benthos. They have extracted two cannons and seven shells. It was common to find a turtle caught in fishing nets. Saudi Aramco was one of the largest contributors to the cleaning process. It provided support to other Oil-response teams, distributing protection equipment and materials. Moreover, many Saudi Aramco employees were involved in volunteer teams to clean up marine life.

The Royal Commission in Jubail has established a new program to monitor oil spill or any other chemical materials. In addition, it studies the possibility of oil leakage and how it can be stopped in an emergency. Also, Aramco stores additional anti-pollution equipment and ships.

References 

Gulf War
Gulf wars
Environmental impact of war